Hin Vordende Sod & Sø is the first full-length album by the Norwegian viking/folk metal band Ásmegin. It was released on August 25, 2003, by Napalm Records. Album lyrics are written in Norwegian, Old Norse, and older Norwegian.

Track listing
 "Af Helvegum" – 2:46	
 "Bruderov paa Hægstadtun" – 3:43	
 "Huldradans - Hin Grønnkledde" – 4:07	
 "Til Rondefolkets Herskab" – 4:04	
 "Over Ægirs vidstragte Sletter" – 3:44	
 "Slit Livets Baand" – 1:32	
 "Efterbyrden" – 5:06	
 "Op af Bisterlitjernet" – 3:41	
 "Vargr i Véum - Eilivs Bane" – 3:42	
 "Blodhevn" – 6:19	
 "Valgalder" – 3:29

Credits
Bjørn Olav Holter – vocals
Marius Olaussen – lead and rhythm guitars, accordion
Raymond Håkenrud – lead and rhythm guitars
Tommy Brandt – drums and percussion, backing vocals
Tomas Torgersbråten – basses, backing vocals

Additional musicians
Lars A. Nedland – clean vocals
Anja Hegge Thorsen – harp
Oddrun Hegge – Langeleik (Norwegian zither)
Lars Fredrik Frøislie – piano, mellotrons and additional keys
Sareeta – fiddle, female chants and vocals
Anne Marie Hveding – "wood-nymph" chants
Børge "Smuldra Glans" Finstad – percussion on track 3
Gunhild Førland – country flutes
Nikolai Brandt – vocals

2003 albums
Ásmegin albums